Venezuela Department was one of the departments of Gran Colombia from 1824 to 1830 (the previous department was substantially larger).

It had borders to 
 Atlantic Ocean in the North.
 Orinoco Department in the East.
 Apure Department in the South.
 Zulia Department in the West.

Subdivisions 
2 provinces and several cantons.

 Caracas Province. Capital: Caracas. Cantones: Caracas, Calabozo, Caucagua, Chaguaramas, La Guaira, La Victoria, Villa de Cura, Ocumare y San Sebastián.
 Carabobo Province. Capital: Valencia. Cantones: Valencia, Barquisimeto, Nirgua, Puerto Cabello, San Felipe y Tocuyo.

Departments of Gran Colombia
1824 establishments in Gran Colombia
1830 disestablishments in Gran Colombia